PATJ may refer to:
Tok Airport, airport code: PATJ
InaD-like protein, a protein encoded by the PATJ gene